Korobeynikov or Korobeinikov (from коробейник meaning peddler) is a Russian masculine surname, its feminine counterpart is Korobeynikova or Korobeinikova. It may refer to:

Larisa Korobeynikova (born 1987), Russian fencer
Mikhail Korobeinikov, Russian anti-communist 
Polina Korobeynikova (born 1996), Russian figure skater
Trifon Korobeynikov, 16th-century Russian merchant and traveler

Russian-language surnames
Occupational surnames